Al Hoceima National Park (Tarifit: Afrag Anamur n Lhusima) is a national park located outside the town of Al Hoceima in Morocco. The park was created in 2004 and is managed by the Haut-Commissariat des eaux et forêts et de la lutte contre la désertification.

Geography
Bordered on the north by the Mediterranean coast on 50 km and south by the National road 16, Al Hoceima National Park is home to some of the most unspoilt coastal sites on the north coast of Morocco, as well as high cliffs and a mountainous interior. Its terrestrial part consists of the partial territories of five communes which are, from west to east, the coastal municipalities of Bni Boufrah, Senada, Rouadi and Izemmouren (between Bni Gmil and Al Hoceima), as well as Ait Kamara, to the south of Izemmouren.

The park is characterised by high limestone cliffs and a wild rocky coast that has experienced little exploitation over the years.

Flora
One hundred and ten species of vascular plant have been recorded in the national park. Among the trees present are the barbary thuya, the Aleppo pine, the lentisk, the wild olive, the carob tree, the Kermes oak, the green oak, the Mediterranean dwarf palm and the jujube. Between the cliffs and rocks are shrubs and grasses, providing a variety of habitats for wildlife.

The marine zone is influenced by both the Mediterranean Sea and the Atlantic Ocean. It is dominated by forests of Cystoseira sp., Saccorhiza polyschides, Laminaria ochroleuca, Laminaria rodreguizii, Phyllariopsis purpurascens and Phyllariopsis brevipes, with 264 species of seaweed having been recorded.

Fauna
Among the many species of seabirds, there is a large colony of ospreys. The waters of the Mediterranean are home to three species of dolphin: the common dolphin, the common bottlenose dolphin and the striped dolphin. The sea caves sometimes provide shelter for the endangered Mediterranean monk seals. The loggerhead sea turtle, the leatherback sea turtle and the green sea turtle feed in the area, and over a hundred species of fish have been recorded here, as well as the rare giant ribbed Mediterranean limpet (Patella ferruginea).

References

National parks of Morocco
Protected areas established in 1942
Geography of Tanger-Tetouan-Al Hoceima
Rif
1942 establishments in Morocco